Legislative elections were held in Åland in 1951.

Results

References

Elections in Åland
Aland
1951 in Finland